The voiced epiglottal or pharyngeal tap or flap is not known to exist as a phoneme in any language. However, it exists as the intervocalic voiced allophone of the otherwise voiceless epiglottal stop  of Dahalo and perhaps of other languages.
It may also exist in Iraqi Arabic, where the consonant 'ayn is too short to be an epiglottal stop, but has too much of a burst to be a fricative or approximant.

There is no dedicated symbol for this sound in the IPA, but it can be transcribed by adding an "extra short" diacritic to the symbol for the stop, .

Features

Occurrence

Notes

References

 
 

Epiglottal consonants
Tap and flap consonants
Pulmonic consonants
Voiced oral consonants